Deselm is an unincorporated community in Kankakee County, in the U.S. state of Illinois.

History 
A post office was established at Deselm in 1867, and remained in operation until 1902.

John B. Deselm, the first postmaster, gave the community its name.

References 

Unincorporated communities in Kankakee County, Illinois
Unincorporated communities in Illinois
1867 establishments in Illinois
Populated places established in 1867